Voicing may refer to:

 Voicing (music), the distribution of a chord's notes, either in composition or orchestration
The regulation of tone and loudness of an instrument's notes:
Piano_maintenance#Voicing
Voicing (pipe organ)
Plectrum#Voicing_harpsichord_plectra

 Voicing (phonetics), in phonetics and phonology 
 Consonant voicing and devoicing

See also

 Voice (disambiguation)
Human voice
Voice (music)
 Voice acting
Voicings, a 1986 album by Rio Nido